Eremo di Sant'Antonio (Italian for Hermitage of Saint Anthony) is an hermitage located in Pescocostanzo, Province of L'Aquila (Abruzzo, Italy).

History

Architecture

References

External links
 

Anthony
Pescocostanzo